Geopora is a genus of truffle-like fungi in the family Pyronemataceae, currently with 13 described species. The genus was circumscribed by mycologist Harvey Willson Harkness in 1885. Molecular phylogenetic reconstructions indicate that the cup-like apothecial Geopora should better be placed back in a separate genus, Sepultaria. Geopora  would then only comprise Geopora cooperi and its close relatives.

Species
Species include:
 Geopora arenicola
 Geopora arenosa
 Geopora cercocarpi
 Geopora cervina
 Geopora cooperi
 Geopora foliacea
 Geopora sepulta
 Geopora sumneriana
 Geopora tenuis

References

Pyronemataceae
Truffles (fungi)
Pezizales genera